Arkaroola is the common name for the Arkaroola Wilderness Sanctuary, a wildlife sanctuary situated on  of freehold and pastoral lease land in South Australia. The most common way to get there is by car, but air travel can be chartered from Parafield Airport, Adelaide Airport or Aldinga Airfield. It was used as a location set for the 2002 film The Tracker.

History
The area's first people are the Adnyamathanha. One of their dreamtime or creation stories says that Arkaroo, a mythical monster, drank Lake Frome dry. He then crawled up into the mountains. When he urinated he created the waterholes that are a feature of the area. His movement over the land created Arkaroola Creek.

The first Anglo-Europeans to visit the area was explorer Edward Eyre in 1840 and the surveyor
George Goyder in 1857. There was a small failed settlement nearby, at the Yudnamutana copper mine, from 1860 to 1863. The drought of 1863 drove the miners away. Settlement didn't occur again until 1903, when rubies and sapphires were discovered. By 1910 a copper smelter was built at Yudnamutana and uranium was also discovered nearby by Douglas Mawson, famous Antarctic explorer.

The land was always marginal and projects failed quickly. Uranium exploration persisted sporadically and led to the development of good roads by optimistic companies. The Arkaroola property was fenced by 1935 and a process of eradication of pests started. The land was covered with donkeys and camels. There was a failed health project in 1948.

The Arkaroola Wilderness Sanctuary was established by geologist Reg Sprigg in 1968 after he purchased the pastoral lease. He had been involved in surveys in the area before that. He purchased the  pastoral lease (part of which is now held as freehold) and began the conversion to a wildlife sanctuary. In 1979 he was a trustee of the World Wildlife Fund due to his work in the protection of the yellow-footed rock-wallaby.

In July 2011 South Australian Premier Mike Rann announced a ban on mining in Arkaroola. This was followed in October 2011 by special purpose legislation prohibiting mining, mining exploration and grazing in the ranges. The South Australian government has moved to nominate the Arkaroola area for listing on the National Heritage list, and to secure its nomination for World Heritage listing.

Arkaroola was listed on the South Australian Heritage Register on 27 July 2012.

Mining
Until mid-2011, Arkaroola was under threat from uranium mining; the Adelaide-based mining company Marathon Resources had been prospecting the area around Mount Gee. In 2008, Marathon was found guilty of illegally dumping radioactive waste in a variety of locations throughout the Arkaroola Wilderness Sanctuary, and were ordered to suspend drilling operations. In late 2010, the government renewed the company's mineral exploration license, allowing it to resume exploratory drilling within the protected area, a decision which resulted in public outcry. A poll taken in February 2011 showed that 72 per cent of South Australians, and 79 per cent of Labor voters, were opposed to mining in Arkaroola. Following unprecedented public pressure, the South Australian government announced on 22 July 2011 that mining would be banned forever in Arkaroola, with the aim of national and World Heritage listing.  Mining companies have since threatened legal action against the government.

Protection of Arkaroola from mining, including Mount Gee and the Mount Painter inlier, is provided by the Arkaroola Protection Act 2012, which created the Arkaroola Protection Area.

Birds
Arkaroola is part of the  Gammon Ranges and Arkaroola Important Bird Area (IBA), identified as such by BirdLife International because it supports a population of the restricted-range short-tailed grasswren as well as populations of the pied honeyeater, chirruping wedgebill and cinnamon quail-thrush.

Tourist activities

Road loops and 4WD tracks
There are self-drive and organised tour tracks for 2-wheel drives and 4-wheel drives, ranging from beginner to advanced in difficulty.

The Echo Camp Backtrack self-drive track leads through some wonderful country and then over the hills (rough) and down onto the plains east of the Flinders Ranges.  This joins another track back to Arkaroola via Claude's Pass, Stubb's Waterhole, Bararranna Gorge (an area where yellow-footed rock wallabies are commonly found), Welcome Pound and back to the main road to the Arkaroola Village.

Organised tours provide trips along the ridge top track with three lookouts that end at Siller's Lookout, providing a view across the plains towards Lake Frome and the Beverley Uranium Mine.  Siller's Lookout is named after Bill Siller MBE, whose uranium exploration companies constructed the Ridge Top Tour track in the late 1960s.  Beverley Uranium Mine, also discovered by Bill Siller's companies, is named after his wife, Beverley.  The track was put in by Mr Jim Hodgekinson, an expatriate Canadian.

Bushwalking
There are a number of walking trails available, guided and self-guided, some are marked and described by the Royal Geographical Society of Australia (SA).

 Spriggina Trail (1 to 1.5 hrs)
 Bararranna Gorge Walk (6.8 km – 3.5 hrs)
 Acacia Ridge (4 to 5 hrs)
Surveyor's Cairn (40 mins)
Griselda Hill (1.5 hrs)
Mawson Valley Trail (2.5 to 3 hrs)    
Arkaroola Waterhole (4 hrs)
Oppaminda Trail (length depends on starting point)
Coloured leaflets about some of these trails at Arkaroola and throughout the Flinders Ranges are available for download from the Walking Trails Support Group.

Astronomy
Arkaroola has two 14-inch telescopes. Weather in the area is usually fine providing clear skies. There is little light pollution, due to the remote location and active control of the local lighting.

Paralana radioactive springs
Paralana geothermal springs are located on Wooltana, north of Arkaroola.
Local granite rocks contain elevated levels of uranium that gives off heat during radioactive decay. Water percolating through fractures in the rock is heated and bubbles out at the surface as a hot spring, with gases such as carbon dioxide, nitrogen, radon and helium. Due to the presence of radon gas, which is heavier than air, staying near the springs for a prolonged period may constitute a health hazard. Living on the floor of the springs is an extremophile algal mat that survives the warm temperatures of 62 °C and high radioactivity.

The Pinnacle
The mountain summit in the area under this name is of volcanic origin (basalt) and is popular for rock climbing.

The Village
Accommodation ranges from motel rooms to caravan and camp sites.

Facilities include a licensed restaurant and bar, swimming pool, small shop, service station (petrol and diesel), and a vehicle workshop.

Climate
The Arkaroola area is classified as having a subtropical desert climate (BWh) according to the Köppen, Trewartha, and Australian Bureau of Meteorology climate classification systems. Summers are hot with occasional storms, while winters are cold and comparatively dry. 

References

Further reading
 Reg C. Sprigg (1984). Arkaroola-Mount Painter in the Northern Flinders Ranges, S.A.: The last Billion Years. The Lutheran Publishing House, Adelaide. 
 Griselda Sprigg; Rod MacLean (2001). DUNE is a four-letter word. Wakefield Press, Mile End. 
 Kristin Weidenbach (2008). Rock Star: The story of Reg Sprigg – an outback legend. East Street Publications, Adelaide.

External links

Arkaroola Wilderness Sanctuary Website

Pastoral leases in South Australia
Towns in South Australia
Flinders Ranges
Wildlife sanctuaries of Australia
Far North (South Australia)
South Australian Heritage Register